A Great Big Bunch of You is a 1932 Warner Bros. Merrie Melodies cartoon, directed by Rudolf Ising. The short was released on November 12, 1932.

Summary
An old, bearded man in a tall stack of hats sleepily drives an unsteady horse-drawn carriage full of junk to a dump, where he unloads his cargo. Bottles descend from the precipice, shattering one on top of another, followed by pans, boots, and bric-à-brac. The well-dressed dummy that once sat prominently atop the eclectic pile tumbles down onto a discarded mattress and bounces from thence, landing on the hard ground and then being struck on the head by a flying cuckoo clock, coming to apparent consciousness as the clock's namesake bird struts forth to issue his mocking, namesake call. Having teased the doll, the bird chassés back to his wooden home, once more taunting his victim before entering. The doll, no longer dazed, happy to have found life, skips and slides merrily over to the ruin of a piano, its keyboard and hammers intact, its soundboard and strings quite absent. The dummy places a nearby discarded box-spring such that its springs may stand in for the strings of an upright piano; he plays, singing the title song, scatting here and there, even to the percussive accompaniment of his seat's slapping rhythmically against his backside. The dummy's gloves pull away from his hands, marching and dancing along the keys unbidden, then returning to the wearer.

We cut to a pair of shoes, hopping about to the music and sticking out their tongues at each other. Springing from his stool, the dummy zips away, his broad, circular feet conveniently becoming wheels for ease of transport; spreading wide his legs, he spins about, with the aid of his wheels, in a great circle. Jettisoning his old headgear, the dummy dons a straw hat hanging from a rack standing by. Bending knee and elbow, he croons the title song après Chevalier. Many toys present clap and cheer; a cash register chimes, a dog barks its approval; clocks, cuckoo or otherwise, ring in rapture. Tossing aside the tossed straw hat, donning a silken one and picking up a clarinet from off of a nearby chest, our wooden friend asks, in the fashion of Ted Lewis, "Is everybody happy?" Cheers! Stepping lively, he awakens his woodwind with a merry melody: a grandfather clock, bent over with age but filled with the spirit of song, dances about, finding himself a maypole around which little alarm clocks gaily prance; three little soldiers newly animated march in array, aiming and firing their pop-guns at opposing glass bottles and marching onward as the vessels burst into oblivion. They fire at the little ship in a discarded (mirror image-)print of Washington Crossing the Delaware; soggy but undaunted, the General and his men march out of the river and onto land, the commander himself bearing the stars and stripes, one man hymning "Yankee Doodle" to his fife, the other dutifully at his snare drum, as the little warriors stand at attention. The dummy has been marching in step; coming upon a bath towel, which he declares a magic carpet, he flies off to another space in the dump, where mannequins and a bust (perhaps of Mozart) stand at the ready, their hands on a trombone, another clarinet, a saxophone, and a violin. The dummy conducts for a moment with his hands before returning to his instrument; another grandfather clock swings its pendulum back and forth to strike two opposing wash bins; another doll has become the drummer, hanging bottles his chimes, another basin his bass drum, and, as he pulls a chain to activate a shower, he decides to use the individual streams of water as the strings of a harp. Three female display-mannequins, each embracing another's shoulder or hip, sing the title song: "A little whoozits, a little whatzits, and a great big bunch of you!" An owl scats, two hat racks, hats on head and canes in hand, dance. The dummy has taken to conducting his band with his clarinet; he plays a vacuum cleaner as though it were a set of bagpipes. The rusted frame of a car fires its exhaust in rhythm as the doll prances his way back to the makeshift clavier to sing a few last bars; as he finishes, an avalanche of junk tumbles down and buries him. Unflinching, he emerges with a cry of, "Is everybody happy?"

Ted Lewis
Ted Lewis is caricatured here and in the slightly later Looney Tune, Bosko in Person; in each of these shorts, the main character imitates Lewis's signature phrase, "Is everybody happy?"

Dating discrepancy
This article follows the chronology given in the article Looney Tunes and Merrie Melodies filmography (1929–39). However, in addition to the aforementioned discrepancy regarding this short's date of release, Leonard Maltin's Of Mice and Magic gives a different order of the releases of several of the Harman-Ising Warner Bros. shorts than the one found in Wikipedia's list.

References

External links
 A Great Big Bunch of You on YouTube

Merrie Melodies short films
Warner Bros. Cartoons animated short films
Films directed by Rudolf Ising
Films scored by Frank Marsales
1932 animated films
1932 films
Vitaphone short films
American black-and-white films
1930s Warner Bros. animated short films
Films about dolls